National central cities are a group of cities in China charged with leading, developing, and performing tasks in politics, economics, and culture. The concept was proposed by the Ministry of Housing and Urban-Rural Development of the People's Republic of China in 2005 as a first step in reforming urbanization in China.

The national central cities' spheres of influence have great impact around the surrounding cities on modernizing and integrating services in fields such as infrastructure, finance, public education, social welfare, sanitation, business licensing and urban planning. Please refer to the detailed list below for a list of the national central cities. Note that though both Shenzhen and Hangzhou rank higher on the GaWC in comparison to Wuhan, Zhengzhou and Xi'an, they were not included.

Gallery

See also 
 List of Chinese municipalities and prefecture-level cities by GDP
 List of Chinese municipalities and prefecture-level divisions by GDP per capita
 List of cities in the People's Republic of China by urban population
 List of province-level capitals and sub-provincial cities in the People's Republic of China

References 

Metropolitan areas of China